Weibo Gaming is a Chinese esports organization owned by the Weibo Corporation. 

Its League of Legends team competes in the LPL, the top-level league for the game in China. It was owned by e-commerce company Suning.com for most of its history and was previously known as Suning.

League of Legends

History 

The League of Legends team was founded as Suning Gaming on 28 December 2016, following Suning.com's acquisition of the League of Legends team T.Bear Gaming. A roster was formed to compete in the LSPL, China's secondary pro league; it consisted of XiaoAL (now Langx), Avoidless, dian, Fury, and Yoon. Suning placed second in the 2017 LSPL spring regular season and later swept Young Miracles in the spring finals to qualify for the LPL.

Roster

Tournament results

Notes

References

External links 
 

2016 establishments in China
Esports teams established in 2016
Esports teams based in China
League of Legends Pro League teams